Farrokh may refer to:

Farrokh (name), including a list of people with the given name and surname, also variant spellings
Qanat-e Farrokh, village in Iran
Farrokh Pey, village in Iran
Farrokh Shahr, city in Iran
 Farrokh Bolagh, East Azerbaijan, village in Iran
 Farrokh Bolagh, Hamadan, village in Iran
Zu ol Farrokh, village in Iran

See also
Farrokhzad (disambiguation)
Farukh (disambiguation)